Christian I generally refers to Christian I of Denmark. It may also refer to:

Christian I (Archbishop of Mainz) (c. 1130–1183)
Christian I, Count of Oldenburg (died 1167)
Christian I, Elector of Saxony (1560–1591)
Christian I, Prince of Anhalt-Bernburg (1568–1630)
Christian I, Count Palatine of Birkenfeld-Bischweiler (1598–1654)
Christian I, Duke of Saxe-Merseburg (1615–1691)